Caria Castalia Mantinea Pérez Zeledon, Costa Rica

Caria  is a genus in the family Riodinidae. They are resident in the Americas.

Species list 

 Caria castalia (Ménétriés, 1855) Brazil et au Peru.
 Caria chrysame (Hewitson, 1874) Bolivia , Peru.
 Caria domitianus (Fabricius, 1793)  Mexico, Guatemala, Venezuela, Colombia , Trinidad and Tobago.
 Caria ino Godman & Salvin, [1886]  Mexico
 Caria mantinea (C. & R. Felder, 1861) Mexico, Panama, Bolivia, Ecuador , Peru.
 Caria marsyas Godman, 1903  Paraguay , Brazil.
 Caria melino Dyar, 1912  Mexico
 Caria plutargus (Fabricius, 1793)  Brazil.
 Caria rhacotis (Godman & Salvin, 1878)  Honduras, Guatemala, Panama, Colombia , Peru.
 Caria sponsa (Staudinger, [1887]) Peru.
 Caria stillaticia Dyar, 1912 Mexico
 Caria tabrenthia Schaus, 1902 Bolivia , Peru.
 Caria trochilus Erichson, [1849] Guyane, Guyana, Brazil , Peru.

Sources
 Caria

External links
 images representing Caria at Encyclopedia of Life
images representing Caria at Consortium for the Barcode of Life

Riodininae
Butterfly genera
Taxa named by Jacob Hübner